Gary Stephen Armstrong (born 2 January 1958)  is an English former professional footballer. His clubs included Wimbledon, Crewe Alexandra and Gillingham.

References

1958 births
Living people
Footballers from West Ham
English footballers
Gillingham F.C. players
Wimbledon F.C. players
Ebbsfleet United F.C. players
Kemi City F.C. players
Barnet F.C. players
Crewe Alexandra F.C. players
Haringey Borough F.C. players
Heybridge Swifts F.C. players
Hornchurch F.C. players
Harlow Town F.C. players
English Football League players
Association football defenders